Kawa is a surname with multiple origins. Notable people with this surname include:

 Cosei Kawa, Japanese illustrator
 Florence Kawa (1912–2008), American artist
 Franciszek Kawa (1901–1985), Polish skier
 Jakub Kawa (born 1988), Polish footballer
 Joanna Marszałek-Kawa, Polish lawyer
 Malki Kawa, American sports manager
 Katarzyna Kawa (born 1992), Polish tennis player
 Marek Kawa (born 1975), Polish politician
 Sebastian Kawa (born 1972), Polish glider pilot

See also
 

Polish-language surnames